Catherina is a feminine given name. Notable people with the name include:

 Dona Catherina of Kandy (died 1613), ruling Queen of Kandy in 1581
 Catherina Boevey (1669–1726), English philanthropist
 Catherina Cibbini-Kozeluch, (1785–1858), Austrian pianist and composer
 Catherina Heß (born 1985), German actress
 Catherina McKiernan (born 1969), Irish long-distance runner
 Catherina van Holland ( 1280–1328), bastard child of Floris V, Count of Holland

See also

Catarina (disambiguation)
Catharina (disambiguation)
Catharine (disambiguation)
Catherine (disambiguation)
Catrina (disambiguation)
Catrine
Catriona
Katarina (disambiguation)
Katarzyna
Katharina
Katharine
Katherina (disambiguation)
Katherine 
Katrina (disambiguation)
Katryna
Cate
Cathy (disambiguation)
Kate (disambiguation)
Kasia (disambiguation)
Kathy
Katy (disambiguation)

Feminine given names